The Swiss ambassador in Beijing is the official representative of the Government in Bern to the Government of China.

List of representatives

References 

 
China
Switzerland